Kenyatta is an East African surname derived from the beaded belt worn by Maasai.

People with the name
Jomo Kenyatta ( 1897/98–1978), first Prime Minister and President of Kenya
Kamau Kenyatta (born 1955), American musician, record producer, arranger, film composer, and jazz educator
Kwame Kenyatta (1956–2019), American politician
Malcolm Kenyatta (born 1990), American community activist and politician
Margaret Kenyatta (born 1964), Kenyan educator and First Lady of Kenya
Margaret Kenyatta (mayor) (1928–2017), Kenyan politician
Muhammad Kenyatta (1944–1992), American academic, civil rights leader, and politician
Muhoho Kenyatta (born 1965), Kenyan businessman
Ngina Kenyatta (born 1933), First Lady of Kenya
Nyokabi Kenyatta (born 1963), Kenyan businesswoman and philanthropist
Robin Kenyatta (1942–2004), American jazz alto saxophonist
Uhuru Kenyatta (born 1961), fourth President of Kenya

Fictional characters
Abraham Kenyatta, a character in the television series Zoo

See also
 Kenyatta family
 Kenyatta (given name)
 Kenyatta (disambiguation)

References

Surnames of African origin